Money Island is the southwesternmost island in the Crescent Group of the Paracel Islands archipelago. It rises to a height of 6 metres and is covered with brush. At the eastern side of the island lies an extensive reef, which contains a central lagoon, but the reef is mostly submerged at high tide. The sand cay at the southeastern extremity of reef is the reef's highest point. The reef continues around to the north side of the island. There is a small reef on the south side with a man-made channel cut through it to the beach.

Money Island was named after William Taylor Money, the Superintendent of the Bombay Marine (a forerunner of the Royal Indian Navy) from 1803-1810. The name was conferred by the British surveyor of the Paracel Islands Captain Daniel Ross. Ross's ship, the Antelope, gave its name to the nearby Antelope Reef. The Chinese names (e.g. Jin Yin Dao for Money Island) are simple translations of the English names. The Vietnamese name Quang Ảnh dates from 1815 when the commander Phạm Quang Ảnh led the expedition to the islands in the reign of Emperor Gia Long.

Claim to the island, as part of the Paracels, has been made by the Republic of China (Taiwan) and Vietnam.  While the island is uninhabited, patrols are made by the Navy of the People's Republic of China, who have built a fisherman's rest area there. It is believed that the south channel was cut by Chinese naval personnel.

See also
Paracel Islands

References

Paracel Islands
Territorial disputes of the Republic of China
Territorial disputes of Vietnam
Territorial disputes of China
Disputed territories in Asia